"The Rockafeller Skank", usually called "Funk Soul Brother" by fans, is a song by English big beat musician and DJ Fatboy Slim. It was released as the lead single from his second studio album, You've Come a Long Way, Baby (1998), on 8 June 1998. The single peaked at number six on the UK Singles Chart in June 1998 and topped the Icelandic Singles Chart for a week the same month and was the second Fatboy Slim single (after "Praise You") to chart on the US Billboard Hot 100, peaking at number 78. In 2022, Rolling Stone ranked "The Rockafeller Skank" number 199 their list of 200 Greatest Dance Songs of All Time.

Critical reception
Larry Flick from Billboard wrote, "Using self-consciously old-school DJ techniques (scratching and repetition of a spoken phrase, dramatic tempo changes), Fatboy Slim has created an organically simple masterpiece. With the accessibility of Beck, the danceability of ska, and the sunny quality of the Beach Boys, the track has a sparse, magnetic beginning that builds in depth and intensity (with the addition of jangly guitar riffs and more complex beats) to a meticulous, frenetic climax. And the wind-down is no less danceable." 

Will Hermes from Entertainment Weekly called it a "remarkable splice-rock roller coaster". He added, "Big, dynamic, spectacularly dumb, it grafts Duane Eddy guitar twang (via John Barry) onto Godzilla-goes-Motown beats, adds an MC non sequitur, and presses "frappe" on the digital blender. Result? The most potent DJ pop since "Firestarter". If this won't convert the techno-phobes, nothing will." 

A reviewer from Music & Media stated that the track "easily matches the extremely high quality one would expect from a chart veteran with such names as the Housemartins, Beats International, The Mighty Dubcats and Pizzaman on his CV." He explained further, "This time around, he's somehow managed to fuse big beat and dance with surf—seasoned with a slight pinch of punk—and has come up with what is probably the single most infectious sound around on the airwaves right now."

Samples

The song features the repeated line "Right about now, the funk soul brother / Check it out now, the funk soul brother", which is a truncated vocal sample of rapper Lord Finesse on the track "Vinyl Dogs Vibe" by Vinyl Dogs. The original line, a spoken-word introduction to the instrumental track, was "Check it out right about now, it's no other than the funk soul brother, the Lord Finesse. And you're welcome to the world of the Vinyl Dogs right about now".

Lord Finesse spoke about his "contribution" for the first time in 2019. He recalled receiving a fax about Fatboy Slim wanting to use his vocal sample for "The Rockafeller Skank", to which he agreed. However, he was shocked to learn the song was not what he had in mind, thinking it was going to be Hip Hop and not Big Beat. He called it a "big mistake" and expressed regret for not listening to the song first before sending his approval, and not having someone look at the contract before he signed it. Regardless, Lord Finesse remains proud of the success of "The Rockafeller Skank" but says it could have been his "retirement money."

The song also features eight other samples, including a sample of the song "Sliced Tomatoes" by the band Just Brothers (a popular Northern soul track); The Bobby Fuller Four's "I Fought the Law" (featuring DeWayne Quirico's drum intro); "Join the Gang" by David Bowie; and a sample of "Beat Girl" by John Barry and his Orchestra. Guitar lines were also sampled from "Twistin' 'N' Twangin'" by Duane Eddy and "Why Can't You Love Me" by Brian Poole & The Tremeloes, along with a shout from the song "Soup" by the J.J. All-Stars.

Fatboy Slim has stated that to clear the samples and release the song he had to release 100% of the track's royalties, 25% to each artist, meaning he receives no royalties himself.

Track listings

 UK and Australian CD single
US maxi-CD and cassette single
 "The Rockafeller Skank" (short edit)
 "The Rockafeller Skank"
 "Always Read the Label"
 "Tweakers Delight"

 UK and US 12-inch single
A1. "The Rockafeller Skank"
B1. "Always Read the Label"
B2. "Tweakers Delight"

 UK cassette single and European CD single
 "The Rockafeller Skank" (short edit)
 "Always Read the Label"

 Japanese CD single
 "The Rockafeller Skank" (short edit)
 "The Rockafeller Skank"
 "Always Read the Label"
 "Tweakers Delight"
 "Everybody Loves a Carnival" (radio edit)

Charts

Weekly charts

Year-end charts

Certifications and sales

Release history

References

1998 songs
1998 singles
Astralwerks singles
Big beat songs
Fatboy Slim songs
Number-one singles in Iceland
Songs with music by John Barry (composer)
Songs written by Norman Cook
Skint Records singles
UK Independent Singles Chart number-one singles